The Coordinating Committee for Earthquake Prediction (CCEP) (Japanese: 地震予知連絡会, Jishin Yochi Renraku-kai) in Japan was founded in April 1969, as part of the Geodesy Council's Second Earthquake Prediction Plan, in order to carry out a comprehensive evaluation of earthquake data in Japan. The committee consists of 30 members and meets four times each year, as well as publishing a report on its activities twice each year. The CCEP brings together representatives from 20 governmental bodies and universities engaged in earthquake prediction and research. It has a secretariat within the Ministry of Land, Infrastructure, Transport and Tourism.

History
The first moves towards the Committee were taken after earthquake researchers published Earthquake Prediction - Current Status and Action Plan in 1962. This was adopted by the General Assembly of Geodesy Council with the launch of their first prediction plan in 1964. Following earthquakes in 1964, 1965, and 1968 the EEPC was founded to coordinate future prediction activities.

Geographical Areas of Observation
In order to focus future work, based on the geological evidence, and as well as the prediction of a Tōkai earthquake in the relatively near future, in 1970, the CCEP designated certain areas of Japan as Areas of Specified Observation or Areas of Intensified Observation. The Tōkai region was upgraded to an Area of Intensified Observation in 1974.

By 1978, when some of the boundaries were also changed, eight Areas of Specified Observation and two Areas of Intensified Observation had been designated.

Areas of Intensified Observation
South Kantō
Tōkai region

Participating organisations
The following organisations are represented on the CCEP:

Universities
Institute of Seismology and Volcanology, Hokkaido University
Research Center for Prediction of Earthquakes and Volcanic Eruptions, Tohoku University
School of Life and Environmental Sciences, University of Tsukuba
School of Science, University of Tokyo
Earthquake Research Institute, University of Tokyo
Volcanic Fluid Research Center, Tokyo Institute of Technology
Research Center for Seismology, Volcanology and Disaster Mitigation, Nagoya University
Department of Geophysics, Kyoto University
Disaster Prevention Research Institute, Kyoto University
Geospheric Structure and Dynamics Laboratory, Tottori University
Institute of Seismology and Volcanology, Kyushu University
Nansei-Toko Observatory for Earthquakes and Volcanoes, Kagoshima University
Institute of Statistical Mathematics

Governmental organisations
National Research Institute for Earth Science and Disaster Prevention
Japan Agency for Marine-Earth Science and Technology
Geological Survey of Japan, National Institute of Advanced Industrial Science and Technology
Hydrographic and Oceanographic Department, Japan Coast Guard
Japan Meteorological Agency / Meteorological Research Institute
Geospatial Information Authority of Japan

Other bodies
Tono research institute of Earthquake Science
Hot Springs Research Institute, Kanagawa Prefecture

See also
Kiyoo Mogi, former chair of the CCEP
Seismicity in Japan
Nuclear Power in Japan - Seismicity

References

External links

Science and technology in Japan
Organizations established in 1969
Geology of Japan
Earthquake and seismic risk mitigation
Prediction
Earthquakes
1969 establishments in Japan